MES International School, Pattambi is an International school in Pattambi, Kerala, India. It is a CBSE-affiliated school that is run by the Muslim Educational Society. The school is located on a  site. The principal of the school is Asha Byju..It is Resedntial School.

References

External links 

 
 Virtual tour of the school

High schools and secondary schools in Kerala
Schools in Palakkad district
Educational institutions established in 1978
1978 establishments in Kerala